R59 may refer to:
 R59 (London Underground car)
 R59 (South Africa), a road
 , a destroyer of the Royal Navy
 Mini Roadster, a car
 R59: Dangerous for the ozone layer, a risk phrase